North Korea competed as the Democratic People's Republic of Korea at the 1996 Summer Olympics in Atlanta, United States.

Results by event

Athletics
Men's Marathon
 Kim Jung-Won → 38th place (2:19.54)
 Kim Jong-Su → 40th place (2:20.19)
Women's Marathon
 Jong Song-Ok → 20th place (2:35.31)
 Kim Chang-Ok → 26th place (2:36.31)

Boxing
Men's Bantamweight (54 kg)
Jong Gil Hoe
 First Round — Lost to Zahir Raheem (United States) on points (4-19)

Diving
Women's 3m Springnboard
Ri Ok-Rim
 Preliminary Heat — 219.63 (→ did not advance, 22nd place)

Women's 10m Platform
Ri Ok-Rim
 Preliminary Heat — 230.16 (→ did not advance, 23rd place)

Wrestling

References
Official Olympic Reports
International Olympic Committee results database

Korea, North
1996
1996 in North Korean sport